For the medicinal lozenge, see Pastille and Throat lozenge.
For the form of poetic meter, see trochee.

Troche is a commune in the Corrèze department in central France.

Population

See also
Communes of the Corrèze department

References

Communes of Corrèze
Corrèze communes articles needing translation from French Wikipedia